The Gibson-Sowards House, at 3110 N 250 W in Vernal, Utah, was built in 1891. It was listed on the National Register of Historic Places.  The listing included four  contributing buildings and four contributing structures.

It is a wood frame one-and-a-half-story house built on a sandstone foundation, with the sandstone taken from a hill just to its north.  It is Victorian Eclectic in style, with an irregular plan, an asymmetrical facade, and decorative porches. It includes restrained Queen Anne elements such as lathe-turned columns, decorative brackets, and scroll-cut patterned railings on its west and south porches.

Seven other contributing resources are: a log shed, a round metal granary, ruins of a rock house built around the 1880s, a 1925 garage, a c.1900 hay-derrick, a plank shed, and assorted corral fencing and water and feed troughs.

References

National Register of Historic Places in Uintah County, Utah
Victorian architecture in Utah
Houses completed in 1891